UFC 156: Aldo vs. Edgar  was a mixed martial arts event held by the Ultimate Fighting Championship on February 2, 2013, at the Mandalay Bay Events Center in Paradise, Nevada.

Background

A bout between Dan Henderson and Lyoto Machida was briefly linked to this event, but was eventually moved to UFC 157 to bolster that event's card.

Erick Silva was expected to face Jay Hieron at the Rocksville event; however, Silva pulled out of the bout citing an injury, and was replaced by promotional newcomer Tyron Woodley.

A date between Robbie Peralta and Akira Corassani was briefly linked to this event; however the bout was rescheduled for April 6, 2013 at UFC on Fuel TV 9 after Corassani was sidelined for a short period with an illness.

At the weigh-ins, promotional newcomer Dustin Kimura came in heavy weighing in at 139 lb.  Kimura was given two hours to cut to the bantamweight maximum of 136 pounds, but he elected instead to surrender a percentage of his fight purse to his opponent Chico Camus.

Results

Bonus awards

Fighters were awarded $50,000 bonuses.
 Fight of the Night: José Aldo vs. Frankie Edgar
 Knockout of the Night: Antônio Silva
 Submission of the Night: Bobby Green

Reported payout

The following is the reported payout to the fighters as reported to the Nevada State Athletic Commission. It does not include sponsor money and also does not include the UFC's traditional "fight night" bonuses or Pay-Per-View quotas.
 José Aldo: $240,000 (includes $120,000 win bonus) def. Frankie Edgar: $120,000
 Antônio Rogério Nogueira: $174,000 (includes $67,000 win bonus) def. Rashad Evans: $300,000
 Antônio Silva: $70,000 (no win bonus) def. Alistair Overeem: $285,714
 Demian Maia: $120,000 (includes $60,000 win bonus) def. Jon Fitch: $66,000
 Joseph Benavidez: $60,000 (includes $30,000 win bonus) def. Ian McCall: $9,000
 Evan Dunham: $46,000 (includes $23,000 win bonus) def. Gleison Tibau: $33,000
 Tyron Woodley: $87,000 (includes $43,500 win bonus) def. Jay Hieron: $12,000
 Bobby Green: $20,000 (includes $10,000 win bonus) def. Jacob Volkmann: $22,000
 Isaac Vallie-Flagg: $20,000 (includes $10,000 win bonus) def. Yves Edwards: $21,000
 Dustin Kimura: $16,000 (includes $8,000 win bonus) def. Chico Camus: $8,000 ^
 Francisco Rivera: $16,000 (includes $8,000 win bonus) def. Edwin Figueroa: $10,000

^ Dustin Kimura was reportedly fined 20 percent of his purse for failing to make the required weight for his fight. The Nevada State Athletic Commission's initial report did not include information on the penalty.

See also
List of UFC events
2013 in UFC

References

Ultimate Fighting Championship events
Events in Paradise, Nevada
2013 in mixed martial arts
Mixed martial arts in Las Vegas
2013 in sports in Nevada